This is a  list of lakes in the U.S. state of Indiana. The lakes are ordered by their unique names, (i.e. Lake Indiana or Indiana Lake would both be listed under "I").

A 

Adams Lake, LaGrange Co.
Atwood Lake

B 
 Banning Lake, Kosciusko County
 Barton Lake, Steuben County
 Ball Lake, Steuben County
 Bass Lake, Starke County is partially in Bass Lake State Beach
 Big Barbee Lake, Kosciusko County
 Big Long Lake, LaGrange County
 Blue Lake, Southwest Indianapolis
 Boot Lake, Elkhart County
 Briarwood Lake
 Brookville Lake
 Ball Lake, Steuben County

C 
 Cagles Mill Lake
 Cecil M. Harden Lake
 Cedar Lake
 Chamberlain Lake, St. Joseph County
 Chapman Lake, Kosciusko County
 Clear Lake, Steuben County
 Cordry Lake
 Crooked Lake, Steuben County
 Crooked Lake, Whitley County

D 
Dewart Lake
Dallas Lake, LaGrange County
Dogwood Lake, Daviess County

E 
 Eagle Creek Reservoir
 Earlham Lake
 Lake Edgewood
 Lake Everett
Eagle Lake

F 
Lake Freeman
 Flint Lake, Porter County
 Fish Lake, Shipshewana, IN, LaGrange County
 Fishtrap Lake, LaPorte County
 Fites Lake, Porter County 
 Fox Lake, Steuben County
 Fletcher Lake, Fulton County

G 
 Lake Gage, Steuben County
 Geist Reservoir
 Lake George, Hammond, Lake County
 Lake George, Hobart, Lake County
 Lake George, Steuben County, extending into Michigan
 Gibson Lake
 Golden Lake, Steuben County
 Goose Lake (Whitley County, Indiana)
 Grandview Lake, Bartholomew County, Indiana
 Lake Greenwood
 Griffy Lake
 Lake Geneva (Switzerland County)

H 
 Hackenburg Lake, LaGrange County
 Hadley Lake, Tippecanoe County
 Hardy Lake
 Harrison Lake
 Hart Lake
 Heaton Lake, Elkhart County
 Heritage Lake
 Huntington Lake
 Hudson Lake, LaPorte County
Hamilton lake, Steuben County

I 
 Indian Lake
 Indiana Lake, Elkhart County (extends into Michigan)
 Irish Lake, Kosciusko County

J 
 Lake James, Steuben County—adjacent to Pokagon State Park.
 Jimmerson Lake, Steuben County

K 
 Lake Kickapoo, Greene County – located in Shakamak State Park
 Knapp Lake
 Koontz Lake
 Kayak Lake – is a water filled, surface, coal mine in Hamilton Twp., Sullivan County.
 Kuhn Lake, Kosciusko County

L 
 Lamb Lake Is a 500-acre private lake in Hensley Township, Johnson County.
 Lake Lemon
 Little Barbee, Kosciusko County
 Long Lake, Indiana Dunes National Park, Porter County
 Long Lake, Steuben County
 Long Lake, Wabash County
 Long Lake, Valparaiso, Porter County
 Loomis Lake, Porter County
 Loon Lake, Whitley/Noble Counties
 Lutheran Lake, Bartholomew County
 Lake Bruce Pulaski and Fulton county

M 
  McDonald Lake
 Lake Manitou
 Martin Lake, LaGrange County
 Lake Maxinkuckee
 Lake Michigan Although not fully inside of Indiana, it does come in contact with the state border.
 Messick Lake, LaGrange County
 Mink Lake, Porter County
 Mississinewa Lake
 Lake Monroe (Monroe Reservoir)
 Morse Reservoir
 Monroe County Lake
 Mohawk Lake is a water filled surface coal mine pit in Hamilton Twp., Sullivan County, Indiana
 Mud Lake, St. Joseph County

N 
 North Chain Lake, St. Joseph County
 Nyona Lake

O 
Olin Lake, the largest undeveloped lake in the state. (LaGrange County))
Oliver Lake, LaGrange County

P 
 Lake Papakeechie
 Patoka Lake
 Pine Lake, LaPorte County
 Lake Pleasant, Steuben County (north)
 Pleasant Lake, Steuben County (south)
 Princes Lakes
 Prairie Creek Reservoir, Delaware  County
 Pretty Lake, Wolcottville, Lagrange County
 Pretty Lake, Plymouth, Marshall County

Q

R 
 Riddles Lake, St. Joseph County
 Ridinger Lake, Kosciusko County
Raccoon Lake, Parke County Indiana.

S 
 Sagers Lake, Porter County
 Salamonie Lake
 Sawmill Lake, Kosciusko County
 Lake Santee
 Sechrist Lake, Kosciusko County
 Shriner Lake
 Lake Shafer
 Silver Lake, Steuben County
 Simonton Lake, Elkhart County, Indiana
 Snow Lake, Steuben County
 South Clear Lake, St. Joseph County (extends into Michigan)
 South Chain Lake, St. Joseph County
 Spectacle Lake, Porter County
 Stanton Lake, Leesburg
 Stone Lake, LaPorte County
 Sugar Mill Lake
 Summit Lake, Henry County – located in Summit Lake State Park
 Sweetwater Lake
 Sylvan Lake, Noble County
 Syracuse Lake
 Shipshewana Lake, Shipshewana, Indiana (LaGrange County)

T 
 Lake Tippecanoe, Leesburg
 Trader's Point Lake, Indianapolis, Marion County

U 
 University Lake, on Indiana University Bloomington campus

V 
Viberg Lake (Allen County)

W 
 Wapehani Lake, a.k.a. Weimer Lake, a reservoir on West Fork Clear Creek in Bloomington
 Waubee Lake
 Wauhob Lake, Porter County
 Lake Wawasee
 Webster Lake
 West Otter Lake, Steuben County
 Westler Lake LaGrange County
 Whippoorwill Lake
 Witmer Lake, LaGrange County
 Wolf Lake (Also extends into Illinois.)
 Winona Lake, in the town of Winona Lake, Indiana
 West Boggs Lake (Daviess & Martin County)
 Lake Woodland, Hamilton County
 Worster Lake, located within Potato Creek State Park, St. Joseph County

X

Y

Z

See also

 List of lakes in the United States
 List of rivers in Indiana

References

Lakes

Indiana